Rosy McEwen is a British actress from London. She won the best lead performance award at the British Independent Film Awards in December 2022 for her role as Jean in the British feature film Blue Jean.

Early life
McEwen attended an all-girls Catholic school in London. When she was 12 she auditioned for the film adaptation of Atonement. McEwen got down to the final two but the role went to Saoirse Ronan. McEwen attended the University of Leeds and studied the history of art. After that she attended drama school at the Bristol Old Vic. Born with the surname Byrne, she took the name McEwen (her mothers maiden name) to avoid confusion with the actress Rose Byrne. McEwen had a role in The Cherry Orchard at the Bristol Old Vic and the Manchester Royal Exchange. She also had early television roles in Cranford and Waking The Dead.

Career

Stage roles
McEwen spent time with the Royal Shakespeare Company and won acclaim for her performances in Timon of Athens and Tamburlaine. McEwen appeared as Desdemona in Clint Dyer’s production of Othello at the Royal National Theatre in London, a role The Evening Standard said she “knocked out of the park”.

Screen roles
On screen she appeared with Luke Evans and Dakota Fanning in the Netflix series The Alienist. She played Christopher Eccleston’s daughter in the Channel 4 miniseries Close to Me and alongside Eddie Marsan in the science fiction film Vesper. She also has an upcoming role in the Rosemary’s Baby prequel, Apartment 7A alongside Julia Garner.

Blue Jean
McEwen had the lead role in the film Blue Jean released in the United Kingdom in February 2023. Her performance was variously described as a “revelation”, “riveting”, and “excellent”, as well as being “a powerful, internalised performance”. For the portrayal McEwen earned the award for best lead performance at the British Independent Film Awards in December 2022, a category in which McEwen beat Sally Hawkins, Florence Pugh and Bill Nighy.

Selected filmography

References

External links

English television actresses
English stage actresses
English film actresses
Living people
Actresses from London
Date of birth unknown
Alumni of the University of Leeds
21st-century English actresses